Rocky Face may refer to:

Battle of Rocky Face Ridge fought May 7–13, 1864, in Whitfield County, Georgia during the Atlanta Campaign of the American Civil War. 
 Rocky Face Fault, a geological feature
 Rocky Face, Georgia, an unincorporated area in the U.S. State of Georgia